Lusers is a 2015 Chilean-Peruvian-Argentine adventure comedy film, starring the Peruvian Carlos Alcántara, the Chilean Felipe Izquierdo and the Argentine Pablo Granados. This film "revives" the classic joke of the Peruvian, the Chilean and the Argentine, respectively. It is produced by Tondero Films and Bamboosa, and directed by Ticoy Rodríguez, and was released on October 1, 2015 nationally and internationally. With this film, the distributors Tondero and Bamboosa will go abroad together for the first time.

Synopsis 
A Peruvian, a Chilean and an Argentinean live an eventful journey towards the World Cup in Brazil 2014 that leads them to endure hardships in the Amazonian jungle and eventually to become friends.

Cast 

 Carlos Alcántara as Edgar
 Felipe Izquierdo as Hannibal
 Pablo Granados as Rolo

 Gaby Espino as Black Widow
 Cristián de la Fuente as Pedro

 Claudia Portocarrero as Native
 Andrea Montenegro as Brazilian
 Carlos Carlín as Edgar's friend

Soundtrack 

 Another like you by Eros Ramazzotti
 Lusers (song)
 A friendship without borders by Pablo Granados
 Night Fever by Bee Gees (Spanish version)
 Life goes on the same by Sandro (in the end credits)

Reception 
On the day of its premiere, the film was seen by more than 40,000 spectators, surpassing The Martian, but it was not well received in Chile, only managing to attract 565 spectators on its first day. Lusers became the second most watched Peruvian film of 2015.

References

External links 

 

2015 films
2015 comedy films
Peruvian adventure comedy films
Peruvian buddy comedy films
Chilean comedy films
Argentine adventure comedy films
Tondero Producciones films
2010s Peruvian films
2010s Argentine films
2010s Spanish-language films
Films shot in Peru
Films set in Peru
Films shot in Buenos Aires
Films shot in Argentina
Films shot in Chile
Films set in jungles
Films about friendship
2010s Chilean films